Régis Messac (2 August 1893 – 1945) was a French essayist, poet and translator.

Published works 
Studies
 Le « Detective Novel » et l'influence de la pensée scientifique (1929) ; new edition, corrected and annotated, preface by Claude Amoz, postface by François Guérif: (les Belles Lettres, coll. Encrage/travaux, 2011)
 Influences française dans l'œuvre d'Edgar Poe (1929)
 Micromégas (1936)
 Brève histoire des hommes (1939)
 Esquisse d'une chronobibliographie des Utopies ([1940] 1962)
 La Révolution culturelle ([1938] 1988)
 Les Romans de l’homme-singe, pref. by Marc Angenot ([1935] 2007)
 Les Premières Utopies, pref. by Serge Lehman (Éditions ex nihilo, 2009)
Poetry
 Poèmes guerriers (1929)
Pamphlet
 À bas le latin ! (1933) ; new edition, established, presented and completed by Olivier Messac, pref. by Anne-Marie Ozanam, (Éditions ex nihilo, 2010)
Novels and short stories (SF)
  réédité chez L'Arbre Vengeur coll. L'Alambic in 2007. First English translation Quinzinzinzany by Mathieu Triay in issues One (Visions of Home, 2018) and Two (Visions of humanity, 2019) of Visions, a British science fiction magazine in trade paperback format. 
 La Cité des asphyxiés ([1937] 2010)
 
 Musique arachnéenne ([1934] 1973)
 Le Miroir flexible [1933], pref. by Gérard Klein (2008)
Romans à caractère autobiographique
 Le Voyage de Néania à travers la guerre et la paix [1926], pref. by Didier Daeninckx (Éditions ex nihilo, 2014)
 Smith Conundrum, roman d'une université américaine [1942], pref. by Marc Angenot, postf. de Robert Michel (Éditions ex nihilo, 2010)
Chronicles
 Pot-pourri fantôme ([1942] 1958)
 Roman policier, fragment d'histoire, préf. de Gérard Durozoi (Éditions ex nihilo, 2009)
 La Crise, chronique éditoriale, 1930-1939, préf. de Michel Besnier (Éditions ex nihilo, 2013)
Corresponde gérarnce
 Lettres de prison ([1943] 2005)

Translations 
David H. Keller
 Les Mains et la machine (Stenographer's Hands, 1928), 1932
 La Nourrice automatique (The Psychophonic Nurse, 1928), 1936
 La Guerre du lierre (The Ivy War, 1930), 1936
 Pourquoi ? (The Question), 1937
 Le Fou du ciel (The Flying Fool), 1937
 La Lune de miel perpétuelle (Life Everlasting), 1938
 Le Duel sans fin (The Eternal Conflict), 1939 (publication partielle)
Fitz James O'Brien	
 Animula (The Diamonds Lens), 1931
 L’Histoire du dragon Fang, 1935
Max Nettlau
 Esquisse d'histoire des Utopies (Esbozo de historia de las Utopias, 1934), 1936-1938
Jack London
 Ce que la vie signifie pour moi (What Life Means to Me, 1905), 1939

Pseudonyms 

 Robert Champagnac
 John Doe
 Maxime Dolus	
 Jehan Fabian
 Mad Hobo
 Jérémie Jéricho
 Romain Lécapèr	
 Gontran Lenoir (taken over by his son Ralph)	
 Sancho Llorente
 Robert Ludion
 Le Mandarin
 Columbus North
 L’Ours mal léché	
 Margarita Risa
 Elsa Rothgemünde
 Esteban Scanlan
 Doctor Séraphicus	
 Laurent Zurbarran

Bibliography 
 Bio-bibliographical Notice, by Georges H. Gallet, New York, The Science Fiction News Letter, vol. III, n°10, p. 3-4, 28 January 1939.
 In memoriam, by Roger Denux, la Tribune des fonctionnaires, November 1946.
 Régis Messac, by Ralph Messac, Bulletin des anciens élèves du lycée de Coutances, pages 4 & 5, February 1956.
 Hommage à Régis Messac, by Jean-Jacques Bridenne, Fiction magazine, n°48, November 1957.
 Pour présenter l’auteur… (pref.), by Ralph Messac, in Pot-pourri fantôme, pages 7–9, Paris, Éditions Bellenand, 1958.
 Anthologie des écrivains morts à la guerre (1939-1945), by the Association des écrivains combattants, preface by Maréchal Juin, pages 525-536, Paris, Albin Michel, 1960.
 Un précurseur méconnu de la science-fiction française : Régis Messac, by François Fonvieille-Alquier, pages centrales, Combat, 10 December 1967.
 Régis Messac, by Jean-Jacques Bridenne, Désiré, n°21, April 1969.
 Épitaphe pour Régis Messac, by Francis Lacassin, l'Express, 5 February 1973.
 Régis Messac ou l’humour du désespoir, by Jean-Pierre Andrevon, Fiction, n°236, août 1973.
 La Mort du Loup, itinéraire d’un disparu, (collectif), in Lettres de prison, pages 69–135, Paris, Éditions ex nihilo, 2005.
 Hommage à Régis Messac, by Jean-Jacques Bridenne, A&A le magazine des survivants, n°155, April 2006, repris de Fiction magazine (voir supra).
 Sans titre (préf.), by Marc Angenot, in les Romans de l’homme-singe, pages 7–12, Paris, Éditions ex nihilo, 2007.
 Les Contrepoisons de l'intelligence (prrface), by Éric Dussert, in Quinzinzinzili, p. 5–16, Talence, éd. de l'Arbre vengeur, 2007.
 Sans titre (préf.), by Gérard Klein, in le Miroir flexible, pages 7–17, Paris, Éditions ex nihilo, 2008.
 Sans titre (préf.), by Gérard Durozoi, in Roman policier, fragment d'histoire, pages 7–13, Paris, Éditions ex nihilo, 2009.
 Sans titre (préf.), by Natacha Vas-Deyres, in Valcrétin, pages 7–18, Paris, Éditions ex nihilo, 2009.
 Sans titre (préf.), by Roger Bozzetto, in la Cité des asphyxiés, pages 7–20, Paris, Éditions ex nihilo, 2010.
 Amères racines (préf.), by Anne-Marie Ozanam, in À bas le latin !, pages 5–31, Paris, Éditions ex nihilo, 2010.
 Sans titre (préf.), by Marc Angenot, in Smith Conundrum, roman d'une université américaine, pages 7–15, Paris, Éditions ex nihilo, 2010.
 Régis Messac à l'université McGill (postf.), by Robert Michel, in Smith Conundrum, roman d'une université américaine, pages 167-181, Paris, Éditions ex nihilo, 2010.
 Sans titre (préf.), par Claude Amoz, in Le « Detective Novel » et l'influence de la pensée scientifique, pages 7–19, Paris, les Belles Lettres, coll. Encrage/travaux, 2011.
 Régis Messac, l'écrivain journaliste (collectif, dir. Natacha Vas-Deyres & Olivier Messac), Paris, Éditions ex nihilo, 2012.
 Sans titre (préf.), by Michel Besnier, in la Crise, chronique éditoriale 1930-1939, pages 13–17, Paris, Éditions ex nihilo, 2013.
 Sans titre (préf.), by Didier Daeninckx, in le Voyage de Néania à travers la guerre et la paix, pages 7–13, Paris, Éditions ex nihilo, 2014.

Notices 
 Dictionnaire des anarchistes, « Le Maitron » : notice biographique.
 L'Éphéméride anarchiste : notice biographique.
 René Bianco, 100 ans de presse anarchiste : notice.

External links 
 Régis Messac on data.bnf.fr 
 Connaissez-vous Régis Messac ? 
 
 

People from Charente-Maritime
1893 births
1945 deaths
French bibliographers
French Resistance members
French literary critics
French science fiction writers
French pacifists
French political commentators
20th-century French translators
French male essayists
French male poets
French male novelists
20th-century French poets
20th-century French novelists
20th-century French essayists
20th-century French male writers
Resistance members who died in Nazi concentration camps
People who died in Gross-Rosen concentration camp
People who died in Mittelbau-Dora concentration camp
French people who died in Nazi concentration camps